The Armstrong was a British 4-wheeled cyclecar made in 1913 by the Armstrong Motor Company of Birmingham.

The car was available with a choice of air- or water-cooled, two-cylinder 8 hp engines made by Precision. The cheaper air-cooled version had belt drive to the rear axle, but the dearer water-cooled model had shaft drive.

The number made is not known.

See also
 List of car manufacturers of the United Kingdom

References 

Defunct motor vehicle manufacturers of England
Cyclecars
Defunct companies based in Birmingham, West Midlands
Cars introduced in 1913